Ram is a masculine given name. In South Asia it is a variant of Rama, and in Hebrew it means high or senior, a biblical name (Ram, son of Hezron), which is also sometimes used as a diminutive form of Avram (a variant of Abraham). Notable persons with the name include:

People 
 Ram Chandra Bharadwaj (died 1918), a defendant in the Hindu–German Conspiracy Trial
 Ram Chandra Paudel, Nepalese politician 
 Ram Chiang, Hong Kong actor and singer
 Ram Prasad Bismil (1897-1927), Indian revolutionary
 Ram Bahadur Bomjon (born c. 1990), Nepalese teenager televised meditating for days without moving
 Ram Charan (disambiguation)
 Ram Bahadur Thapa, Nepalese politician
 Guru Ram Das (1534–1581), fourth of the Ten Gurus of Sikhism
 Ram Gopal (disambiguation)
 Ram Kapoor (born 1973), Indian television actor
 Ram Karmi (born 1931), Israeli architect
 Ram Krishna Kunwar, 18th century Nepalese military general
 Ram Dass Katari (1911–1983), Indian Navy vice-admiral and Chief of the Naval Staff
 Ram Kumar (artist) (born 1924), Indian artist
 Ram Kumar (basketball) (born 1964), Indian basketball player
 Ram Madhav (born 1964), Indian politician, writer, journalist and National General Secretary of the Bharatiya Janata Party
 Ram Malla, also known as Kshetra, king of Mallabhum from 1185 to 1209
 Ram Narayan (born 1927), Indian sarangi player
 Ram Pothineni (born 1988), Indian Tollywood film actor
 Ram Prasad (disambiguation)
 Ram Mohan Roy (1772-1833), Indian reformer
 Ram Shah (1606–1641), King of Gorkha, Nepal
 Ram Vilas Sharma (1912–2000), Indian literary critic, linguist, poet and thinker
 Ram Soffer (born 1965), Israeli chess Grandmaster
 Ram Singh (disambiguation)
 Ram Torten (born 1966), Israeli Olympic competitive sailor
 Ram Gopal Varma (born 1962), Indian Tollywood and Bollywood film director
 Ram Gopal Vijayvargiya (1905–2003), Indian painter
 Ramkumar, Indian actor
 Raam Mori (born 1993), Gujarati language short story writer from India
 Ram Puneet Tiwary (born 1979), a Singaporean Indian and alleged murderer of the 2003 Sydney double murders case

Biblical and fictional characters 

 Ram (Biblical figure)
 Ram (comics), a Japanese DC Comics superhero
 Ram, in the 1982 American science-fiction film Tron
 Ram, in the 1999-2003 New Zealand/British TV series The Tribe
 Ram, in the 2011 Japanese role-playing video game Hyperdimension Neptunia Mk2
 Ram (Re:Zero), a character in the light novel series Re:Zero − Starting Life in Another World
 Ram Singh, in the 2016 Doctor Who spinoff Class
 Ram Sweeney, a character in the 1988 American black comedy film Heathers and it's 2014 musical adaptation

Indian masculine given names